The Proctor Building is a historic hotel and commercial building at 520-30 N. Milwaukee Avenue in Libertyville, Illinois. The building was constructed in 1903 during a period of commercial growth in Libertyville spurred by new passenger rail connections to Chicago. The three brothers R.J., C.W., and R.E. Proctor and their cousin E.W. Proctor were the original owners of the building, which was the largest of Libertyville's three hotels when it opened. Architect William G. Krieg designed the building, which features three-sided oriel windows and an elaborate limestone entrance to the hotel. Major businesses such as A&P, Woolworth's, and Jewel occupied the building's first-floor commercial spaces, while the second-floor hotel hosted visitors and became a focal point of the city's business and social circles.

The building was added to the National Register of Historic Places on February 5, 1998.

References

External links

National Register of Historic Places in Lake County, Illinois
Commercial buildings completed in 1903
Hotel buildings completed in 1903
Commercial buildings on the National Register of Historic Places in Illinois
Hotel buildings on the National Register of Historic Places in Illinois
Libertyville, Illinois